WDIZ (1320 AM) is a commercial radio station broadcasting an oldies format. Licensed to Venice, Florida, United States, the station serves the Sarasota metropolitan area. WDIZ is owned by iHeartMedia, Inc. and calls itself "Oldies 1320", Venice's Real Oldies. The station uses iHeartMedia's Real Oldies network that mainly focuses on hits from the 1960s and 1970s.

History
The station signed on as WAMR on February 1, 1960. It was owned by Venice Nokomis Broadcasting, Inc. and was a daytimer station, with a power of 500 watts, and required to sign off at sunset to avoid interfering with other stations on AM 1320. It aired a middle of the road (MOR) music format.

In the 1980s, the daytime power was increased to 5,000 watts and the station was given nighttime authorization with 1,000 watts. In 1988, the station was acquired by Asterisk Radio, Inc., which kept the MOR format in the daytime but added talk programming from NBC Talknet at night. In the 1990s, the music was decreased and talk programming took over the daily schedule.

In 1999, Citicasters acquired the station. Citicasters later merged into Clear Channel Communications, which today is iHeartMedia, Inc. After top-rated 103.5 WDUV Bradenton, an easy listening station, switched to a soft adult contemporary format and moved to a transmitter north of Tampa, Clear Channel decided to go after its displaced listeners in the Sarasota area. WAMR became WDDV, a call sign similar to the departed FM station. WDDV's format changed to adult standards.

On March 17, 2016, WDDV flipped from adult standards to talk and business news. On weekdays, WDDV simulcasted the morning drive time show, "AM Tampa Bay", from sister station AM 970 WFLA Tampa. The rest of the schedule consisted of syndicated talk shows and business news from Bloomberg Radio. Some hours were paid brokered programming.

On May 5, 2020, iHeartMedia flipped WDDV from news/talk to oldies, branded as "Oldies 1320", using iHeartMedia's Real Oldies network. The call sign was changed to WDIZ on June 29, 2020.

Former logo

References

External links

DIZ (AM)
Oldies radio stations in the United States
Radio stations established in 1960
1960 establishments in Florida
IHeartMedia radio stations